Kaio Márcio de Almeida (born 19 October 1984) is a Brazilian swimmer who specializes in the butterfly. He is also known by the reduced versions of his name: Kaio Márcio, Kaio Márcio de Almeida, Kaio Almeida, or Kaio de Almeida.

Almeida was nine years old when he began swimming in Esporte Clube Cabo Branco in João Pessoa. He suffered from asthma attacks and began swimming for medical reasons, and under the influence of his father, José Márcio. At the time, Almeida was nicknamed "Gordo" (fat), a nickname he lost at age 15 when he lost weight and began to train and compete regularly.
As of February 2015, he competes for the swimming team of Minas Tênis Clube.

International career

2003

At the age of 18, Almeida competed in the 200-meter butterfly semifinal at the 2003 World Aquatics Championships in Barcelona, where he ranked 13th. He also swam the 100-meter butterfly, ranking 22nd. In the 100-meter butterfly, he broke the Brazilian record with a time of 53.98 seconds. In the 200-meter butterfly, he broke a 20-year South American record set by Ricardo Prado in 1983. Almeida's time was 1:58.83 and the record was 1:59.00.

In August, Almeida competed at the 2003 Pan American Games in Santo Domingo, where he won silver medals in the 200-meter butterfly and 4×100-meter medley, and a bronze in the 100-meter butterfly. He broke his Brazilian records in the 100-meter butterfly with a time of 53.44 seconds, and in the 200-meter butterfly with a time of 1:58.10, both getting the Olympic index. In the 4×100-meter medley, he broke the South American record with a time of 3:40.02.

2004

In June 2004, participating in the second stage of the Circuit Mare Nostrum in Canet, France, Almeida broke the long-course South American record in the 200-meter butterfly with a time of 1:57.38, which was set by the Venezuelan Rafael Vidal since 1984 (1:57.51). Almeida participated in 2004 Summer Olympics in Athens, where he finished 17th in the 100-meter butterfly, 19th in 200-meter butterfly and 15th in 4×100-meter medley. On 10 September 2004, Almeida broke the South American record in the 50-meter butterfly with a time of 23.33 seconds. The previous record of  23.41 seconds was set in 2001 by Nicholas Santos,.

Almeida competed at the 2004 FINA World Swimming Championships (25 m) held in Indianapolis in October. He finished fourth in the 4×100-meter medley, breaking the South American record with a time of 3:33.02, along with César Cielo, Guilherme Guido and Eduardo Fischer. He also finished fourth in the 50-meter butterflyonly three hundredths of a second away from winning a bronze medal, and seven hundredths of a second away from winning a silver medal. Almeida broke the South American record in the semifinals with a time of 23.22 seconds, and in the final with a time of 23.29 seconds. His semifinal time was the same as that of the silver medalist Mark Foster. Almeida finished fifth in the 100-meter butterflyonly 12 hundredths of a second away from winning a bronze medal. In this event, he broke the South American record twice with times of 52.18 seconds in the heats and 51.80 seconds in the final.

2005

Almeida competed in the 2005 World Aquatics Championships in Montreal, where he was a finalist in the 100-meter butterfly, finishing in seventh place. He also ranked 14th in the 200-meter butterfly and 17th in the 50-meter butterfly.

In 2005, he twice broke the South American record in the 50-meter butterfly with times of 23.17 seconds on 9 September and 22.92 seconds on 21 November. In 17 December, he established a new world record in the short-course 50-meter butterfly with a time of 22.60 seconds. The former world record holder was Ian Crocker of the US, with a time of  22.71 seconds in October 2004. Almeida's record was beaten in 2008 by Australian Matt Jaukovic, who improved the record to 22.50 seconds. On December, Almeida also broke the short-course South American record in the 100-meter butterfly with a time of 50.62 seconds and in the 200-meter butterfly with a time of 1:53.27. He finished among the top three in the world rankings of the butterfly races, became the world record holder in the 50-meter, and finished second in the 100-meter and third in the 200-meter.

2006

Almeida won the gold medal in the 100-meter butterfly in the 2006 FINA World Swimming Championships (25 m) held in Shanghai. It was his biggest title. In the same competition, he also won a bronze medal in the 50-meter butterfly and finished 10th in the 200-meter butterfly. Almeida swam at the 2006 Pan Pacific Swimming Championships, where he finished eighth in the 100-meter butterfly and in the 200-meter butterfly.

2007
At the 2007 Pan American Games in Rio de Janeiro, Almeida won gold medals in the 100-meter butterfly with a time of 52.05 secondsa Pan American Games record and the 200-meter butterfly in 1:55.45 secondsa Pan record and South American recordand a silver in the 4×100-meter medley in 3:35.81 secondsa South American record.

2008
In 2008, Almeida reached the final of the 200-meter butterfly in the  2008 Summer Olympics in Beijing, finishing in seventh place. He finished 15th in the 100-meter butterfly and 14th in the 4×100-meter medley.

2009
On 8 May 2009, at Maria Lenk Aquatic Center, Almeida swam the 200-meter butterfly in 1:53.92 seconds; the fifth-fastest time in the race's history and a South American record. The day before, he broke the South American record for the 100-meter butterfly with a time of 51.64 seconds, but he did not swam the final, in which Gabriel Mangabeira set a new record of 51.21 seconds.

At the 2009 World Aquatics Championships in Rome, Almeida finished in fourth place in the 200-meter butterfly with a time of 1:54.27. He ranked 20th in the 50-meter butterfly and 29th in the 100-meter butterfly.

In the Stockholm stage of the FINA World Cup in November 2009, Almeida broke his South American record in the heats of the 200-meter butterfly with a time of 1:51.46 seconds. At the finals, he set a world record in the short-course 200-meter butterfly in 1:49.11 seconds. Almeida's record was beaten in 2013 by South African Chad le Clos, who improved the record to 1:49.04. A day later, he won another gold, beating the South American record for the 100-meter butterfly twice with times of 50.34 seconds in the heats and 49.44 seconds in the final.

2010

Almeida competed at the 2010 Pan Pacific Swimming Championships in Irvine, California, where he finished fifth in the 200-meter butterfly and 11th in the 100-meter butterfly.

At the 2010 FINA World Swimming Championships (25 m) in Dubai, Almeida won bronze in the 100-meter butterfly with a time of 50.33 seconds. In the 200-meter butterfly, he won silver with a time of 1:51.56 seconds. Along with teammates César Cielo, Felipe França and Guilherme Guido, Almeida broke the South American record for the 4×100-meter medley with a time of 3:23.12 seconds, winning the bronze medal.

2011

In the 2011 World Aquatics Championships held in Shanghai, Almeida finished 10th in the 200-meter butterfly, 25th in the 100-meter butterfly and 14th in the 4×100-meter medley. In the 2011 Pan American Games in Guadalajara, Almeida won the gold in the 4×100-meter medley and bronze in the 200-meter butterfly.

2012
At the 2012 Summer Olympics in London, Almeida finished 15th in the 4×100-meter medley, 17th in the 200-meter butterfly, and 28th in the 100-meter butterfly. At the 2012 FINA World Swimming Championships (25 m) in Istanbul, he finished fourth in the 4 × 100 meter medley, 11th in the 50-meter butterfly  and 18th in the 100-meter butterfly.

Retirement and return

Kaio Almeida retired from swimming and tried to turn a politician, but returned to the pools.

2015
At the 2015 Pan American Games in Toronto, Ontario, Canada, Almeida won a gold medal in the 4×200-metre freestyle relay, by participating at heats. He also finished 5th in the 200 metre butterfly.

2016
At the 2016 Summer Olympics, he competed in the Men's 200-metre butterfly, going to the semifinals, finishing in 14th place.

2018
At the 2018 South American Swimming Championships in Trujillo, Peru, he won a silver medal in the 200 metre butterfly.

Records  

Kaio de Almeida is the current holder of the following records:

Almeida is a former holder of the following records:

See also
List of world records in swimming
List of Pan American Games records in swimming
List of South American records in swimming

References

External links 
 
 
 

1984 births
Living people
Brazilian male freestyle swimmers
Olympic swimmers of Brazil
Swimmers at the 2003 Pan American Games
Swimmers at the 2004 Summer Olympics
Swimmers at the 2007 Pan American Games
Swimmers at the 2008 Summer Olympics
Swimmers at the 2011 Pan American Games
Swimmers at the 2012 Summer Olympics
Swimmers at the 2016 Summer Olympics
World record setters in swimming
Medalists at the FINA World Swimming Championships (25 m)
Swimmers at the 2015 Pan American Games
Pan American Games gold medalists for Brazil
Pan American Games silver medalists for Brazil
Pan American Games bronze medalists for Brazil
Pan American Games medalists in swimming
Brazilian male butterfly swimmers
Medalists at the 2003 Pan American Games
Medalists at the 2007 Pan American Games
Medalists at the 2015 Pan American Games
Medalists at the 2011 Pan American Games
Sportspeople from Paraíba